Sathrathil Oru Raathri is a 1978 Indian Malayalam film,  directed by N. Sankaran Nair. The film stars Kaviyoor Ponnamma, Prathapachandran, Sukumaran and M. G. Soman in the lead roles. The film has musical score by G. Devarajan.

Cast
Kaviyoor Ponnamma
Prathapachandran
Sukumaran
M. G. Soman
Mamatha
Manju Bhargavi
Ravi Menon
Vanchiyoor Radha

Soundtrack
The music was composed by G. Devarajan and the lyrics were written by Yusufali Kechery.

References

External links
 

1978 films
1970s Malayalam-language films
Films directed by N. Sankaran Nair